Strategic Airlines SA, known as Strategic Airlines Luxembourg or Strategic Airlines, was a charter airline headquartered in Luxembourg that operated flights out of the United Kingdom. The airline had bases at Manchester, Birmingham and London-Gatwick offering holiday charter flights for mainly tour operators.

History 
The airline was created in July 2010 in Luxembourg as a subsidiary of the Australian airline Strategic Airlines, which later rebranded as Air Australia on 15 November 2011.

Strategic Airlines commenced services in October 2010 with one Airbus A320 aircraft from its bases at Manchester, Birmingham and London-Gatwick. The airline increased its fleet to three Airbus A320s in 2011.

On 17 February 2012, Air Australia, its parent company ceased operations. Strategic Airlines continued to operate as normal until Olympic Holidays, its only operating tour operator ended its contract on 3 October 2012. Strategic Airlines Luxembourg entered administration on 4 October 2012.

Fleet 
The Strategic Airlines Luxembourg fleet consists of the following aircraft with an average age of 19.3 years as of August 2012:

Destinations
Flights operated from London Gatwick. 
Cyprus
 Larnaca Airport
 Paphos Airport
Greece
 Corfu – Ioannis Kapodistrias Airport
 Heraklion International Airport 
 Rhodes International Airport
 Skiathos Airport
 Thessaloniki Airport
 Zakynthos Airport

Flights operated from Manchester Airport (as of August 2012):
Cyprus
 Larnaca Airport
 Paphos Airport
Greece
 Corfu – Ioannis Kapodistrias Airport
 Heraklion International Airport
 Kos International Airport 
 Rhodes International Airport
 Skiathos Airport
 Zakynthos Airport

Flights operate from Birmingham International Airport (United Kingdom)
Greece
 Corfu – Ioannis Kapodistrias Airport
 Heraklion International Airport 
 Zakynthos Airport
 Rhodes - Diagoras Airport

References

External links

Defunct airlines of Luxembourg
Airlines established in 2010
Airlines disestablished in 2012
Luxembourgian companies established in 2010